The 1954 Nippon Professional Baseball season was the fifth season of operation of Nippon Professional Baseball (NPB).

Regular season

Standings

Postseason

Japan Series

League leaders

Central League

Pacific League

Awards
Most Valuable Player
Shigeru Sugishita, Chunichi Dragons (CL)
Hiroshi Oshita, Nishitetsu Lions (PL)
Rookie of the Year
Tatsuro Hirooka, Yomiuri Giants (CL)
Motoji Takuwa, Nankai Hawks (PL)
Eiji Sawamura Award
Shigeru Sugishita, Chunichi Dragons (CL)

See also
1954 All-American Girls Professional Baseball League season
1954 Major League Baseball season

References